Rail gauge in Slovakia.

Russian gauge – 1520 mm

Two lines connecting to Ukraine are "Russian broad gauge", :

 Uzhhorod–Košice broad-gauge track (Užhorod–Maťovce–Haniska pri Košiciach),
 Čop–Dobrá pri Čiernej nad Tisou.

On 25 November 2008, a tripartite memorandum of understanding was signed between Russia, Ukraine, and Slovakia on the construction of a broad-gauge line to the Austrian border. On 30 April 2009, Austrian chancellor Werner Faymann announced that his government politically supports the construction of a broad-gauge line from the Austro-Slovak border to Vienna. In November 2010, the Slovak Prime Minister Iveta Radičová announced the Slovak government will not support the project, as it threatens the Slovak workplaces in the Dobrá bulk terminal, which would be unnecessary after the completion of the project.

Metre gauge – 1000 mm

 Tatra Electrical Railways / Tatranské elektrické železnice (TEŽ) – 
 Poprad-Tatry–Starý Smokovec–Štrbské Pleso
 Tatranská Lomnica–Starý Smokovec
 Štrbské Pleso–Štrba rack railway
 Košice Children's Heritage Railway / Košická detská historická železnica (KDHŽ) – 
 Čermeľ–Alpínka

Bosnian gauge – 760 mm

 Trenčianske Teplice' Electrical Railway / Trenčianskoteplická elektrická železnica (TREŽ) – 
 Trenčianske Teplice–Trenčianska Teplá
 Čierny Hron River Railway / Čiernohronská železnica (ČHŽ) – 
 Vydrovo dolina–Čierny Balog–Hronec–Chvatimech
 Orava-Kysuce Forrest Railway / Oravsko-kysucká lesná železnica (OKLŽ or HLÚŽ) – 
 Agricultural Museum Railway in Nitra – 
 Váh' River Forrest Railway / Považská lesná železnica (PLŽ) – 
 Pribylina

See also 
 Rail transport in Slovakia

References 

Rail infrastructure in Slovakia
Slovakia